Feel No Fret is the seventh album by Scottish funk and R&B band Average White Band (also AWB) released in 1979 on the RCA label in the United Kingdom and the Atlantic label in the United States.

It reached No. 15 in the UK charts, with 15 weeks in total on the charts, and No. 32 in the US charts.

The album was rereleased in 1994 on the Atlantic & Atco, Rhino Entertainment Remasters Series as "Feel No Fret... and More," containing 4 Bonus Tracks from the 1980 "Shine" sessions.

Track listing

Side 1
"When Will You Be Mine" (Gorrie, Average White Band)
"Please Don’t Fall In Love" (Ball,  Gorrie)
"Walk On By” (Hal David, Burt Bacharach) - (#91 Hot 100 -  # 32 R&B single)  # 18 UK chart
"Feel No Fret" (Stuart, Average White Band, Gorrie, Ferrone)

Side 2
"Stop the Rain" (Gorrie, Stuart)
"Atlantic Avenue" (Ferrone, Gorrie, Average White Band) - # 24 UK chart
"Ace of Hearts" (Ferrone, Gorrie, Stuart)
"Too Late to Cry" (Stuart)
"Fire Burning" (Gorrie, White)

2002 Japan Reissue as "Feel No Fret... and More"
1-9 Original album tracks (as above)
 "Kiss Me"(Hamish Stuart)
"Love Won't Get In The Way" (Alan Gorrie, Gavin Christopher, Hamish Stuart)
"Love Gives, Love Takes Away" (Alan Gorrie)
"Growing Pains" (Alan Gorrie, David Foster, Hamish Stuart)

Personnel
Average White Band
Alan Gorrie – Bass, Vocals & Guitar
Hamish Stuart – Guitar, Vocals & Bass
Roger Ball – Keyboards, Synthesizer & Alto Saxophone
Malcolm Duncan – Tenor Saxophone
Steve Ferrone – Drums & Percussion
Onnie McIntyre – Guitar & Vocals
Additional musicians
Luis Carlos Dos Santos - Surdo on "Atlantic Avenue"
Zeca de Cuica - Cuica on "Atlantic Avenue"
Airto Moreira - Percussion on "Atlantic Avenue"
Mike Brecker - Tenor Saxophone on "Stop The Rain" and "Fire Burning"
Randy Brecker - Trumpet on "Stop The Rain" and "Fire Burning"
Lew Delgatto - Baritone Saxophone on "Stop The Rain" and "Fire Burning"
Luther Vandross – Additional background vocals on "Too Late To Cry"

Production
Recorded at Compass Point Studios, Nassau, Bahamas
Recording Engineer Gene Paul assisted by Benji Armbrister
Mixed at Soundmixers, New York.
Remix Engineer Gene Paul assisted by Tim Bomba
Mastered at Atlantic Studios, New York
Mastering Engineer: George Piros

Critical reaction
AllMusic rates it 2.5/5, calling it "the most uneven album they recorded in the '70s", with positives including "Atlantic Avenue", "When Will You Be Mine", and their cover of the Bacharach and David song "Walk on By".

References

1979 albums
Average White Band albums
RCA Records albums
Atlantic Records albums